The 1925–26 William & Mary Indians men's basketball team represented the College of William & Mary in intercollegiate basketball during the 1925–26 season. Under the third year of head coach J. Wilder Tasker (who concurrently served as the head football and baseball coach), the team finished the season with a 9–8 record. This was the 21st season of the collegiate basketball program at William & Mary, whose nickname is now the Tribe.

William & Mary finished construction in 1925 on Blow Gymnasium, where the men's basketball team would play until the opening of William & Mary Hall in 1970.

Schedule

|-
!colspan=9 style="background:#006400; color:#FFD700;"| Regular season

Source

References

William & Mary Tribe men's basketball seasons
William And Mary Indians
William and Mary Indians Men's Basketball Team
William and Mary Indians Men's Basketball Team